"Jazzman" is a 1974 song performed by Carole King, from her album Wrap Around Joy. King composed the music for the song, while David Palmer (formerly of Steely Dan) wrote the lyrics.

The song is best known for its lengthy saxophone solos, performed by Tom Scott, while King sings an ode to 'the Jazzman' and the effect he has on her. Curtis Amy, saxophonist, composer, and former musical director for the Ray Charles band, was the 'jazz man' of the song.

Shortly after arriving on the Billboard Hot 100, the single rose to the #2 spot for a week in mid-November 1974 (stuck behind "You Ain't Seen Nothing Yet" by Bachman Turner Overdrive). The song also reached No. 4 in the Billboard easy listening chart. The B-side of the "Jazzman" single was "You Go Your Way, I'll Go Mine".

Billboard described "Jazzman" as one of King's most commercial songs, and praised the saxophone playing and backup vocals.  Cash Box said that "the artist's unique vocal is powerfully backed by strong horns and a great pop arrangement." Record World said that its King's "most animated single...since 'I Feel the Earth Move'" and "features the fine sax solos of Tom Scott, along with her own strong overdubbing."

"Jazzman" was nominated for a Grammy Award in 1975 in the category Best Female Pop Vocal Performance, losing out to Olivia Newton-John's song "I Honestly Love You".

"Jazzman" is also prominently featured in The Simpsons episode 'Round Springfield", sung by Yeardley Smith as Lisa Simpson; it is presented as a duet between Lisa and recurring character Bleeding Gums Murphy, who plays the saxophone.

Chart performance

Weekly charts

Year-end charts

See also 

 1974 in music

References

External links
 

1974 singles
Carole King songs
Cashbox number-one singles
Songs written by Carole King
Songs about jazz
Ode Records singles
Song recordings produced by Lou Adler
1974 songs
Vocal jazz songs